Abraham Benjamin Woodson (February 15, 1934 – February 8, 2014) was an American football cornerback and kick returner who played nine seasons in the National Football League, mainly with the San Francisco 49ers. He also spent two years with the St. Louis Cardinals.

Early years
Woodson played high school football for Austin High School in Chicago. Prior to joining the NFL, he played at the University of Illinois in football and track, setting the record for indoor 50 meters high hurdles twice and scoring three second half touchdowns against Michigan State during his time in Illinois.

Career
Woodson was drafted by the San Francisco 49ers in the second round of the 1957 Draft after fulfilling a military commitment. The Niners were a year removed from being one game away from the NFL Championship Game. Unfortunately, the Niners never finished above third during Woodson's tenure, going 6-6, 7-5, 7-5, 7-6-1, 6-8, 2-12, and 4-10. He played two final seasons with St. Louis. While the Cardinals went 5-9 in 1965, they went 8-5-1 in 1966 and finished two games out of playing for the chance to go to the Super Bowl.

As a kick returner, there were few who were better. Of all kick returners in NFL history, his average of 28.7 yards per return is well ahead of any others who have returned over 5,000 yards worth of kicks. He had 193 returns for 5538 yards. He was also dangerous on punt returns, averaging 9 yards a return in his prime with the 49ers. He ranks 21st in career return yards, and his 28.7 average yards per return still ranks 4th all time. Combining his punt and kick return yards, he ranks 34th.

In 2021, the Professional Football Researchers Association named Woodson to the PFRA Hall of Very Good Class of 2021

Post-NFL
After leaving football, he worked as a life insurance agent. He later lived in Las Vegas, where he served as a prison minister in connection with the Churches of Christ. He died on February 8, 2014, aged 79, just a week before his 80th birthday.

References

1934 births
2014 deaths
American football defensive backs
American football return specialists
San Francisco 49ers players
St. Louis Cardinals (football) players
Western Conference Pro Bowl players
Illinois Fighting Illini football players
American members of the Churches of Christ